George Bell (1814–1890) was an English publisher who founded the book publishing house George Bell & Sons.

He was the father of publisher and animal welfare campaigner, Ernest Bell.

He is buried on the western side of Highgate Cemetery.

Location of the Bell houses
1839: 1 Bouverie Street
1840: 186 Fleet Street
1854: Acquired Deighton's offices at Green Street and Trinity Street, Cambridge
1864: Acquired 4 York Street, Covent Garden. This location had quite a pedigree: The previous occupant of these houses was the publishing company of Henry George Bohn; before that they had belonged to the bookseller J.H. Bohte, who specialized in classics; and before that (though not immediately before) they had been the home of Thomas de Quincey.
1867: Moved out of Fleet Street

References

Further reading
 Edward Bell, George Bell, Publisher: A Brief Memoir, London: Printed for private circulation by the Chiswick Press, 1924.
 Marjory Long, "George Bell and Sons", in: Patricia J. Anderson and Jonathan Rose, eds., Dictionary of Literary Biography, Vol. 106: British Literary Publishing Houses, 1820-1880, Detroit and London: Gale, 1991, pp. 22-31.

External links
Archive of George Bell & Sons Ltd in the collection of the University of Reading
 
 

1814 births
1890 deaths
Burials at Highgate Cemetery
Publishers (people) from London
People from Richmond, North Yorkshire
19th-century English businesspeople